The Lac de Montbel is a reservoir 5 minutes from Chalabre, which is a popular location for watersports and swimming. It is located at Sainte-Colombe-sur-l'Hers on the border between the Ariège and Aude départements of southwestern France.

The flooded hillsides are still evident when the water level drops, revealing tree stumps and the thick sticky clay (marl) so typical of the Ariège. On quiet hot summer days the water takes on a beautiful turquoise colour which is very photogenic.

The area is relatively undeveloped and quiet and privacy are a great attraction. The mountains of the Pyrenees are visible in the background.

Other lakes for swimming near Montbel include Lac de la Cavayère and a smaller one at Pradelles-Cabardès.

The dam which created the reservoir was built between 1982 and 1985.

References

External links

 Lac de Montbel on AriegeNews (French)

Lakes of Aude
Lakes of Ariège (department)